The Kuyuwini River is a river  Guyana.

Marudi Mountain is a critical watershed that feeds into the river.

The area surrounding the river is considered traditional lands of the Wapishana, and they monitor the river for environmental threats. Conrad Gorinsky was born in Parubaru, a settlement near the Kuyuwini. 

The river is often used for mining. Illegal mining is a problem in the area, and mining is prohibited under the fourth parallel.

See also
List of rivers of Guyana
Mining in Guyana

References

Bibliography
 Rand McNally, The New International Atlas, 1993.

Rivers of Guyana